KWVT-LD, VHF digital channel 11, is a low-powered YTA TV-affiliated television station serving Portland, Oregon, United States that is licensed to Salem. Its transmitter is located in West Portland. Operated by Northwest Television, LLC, the call sign KWVT-LD stands for "Willamette Valley Television".

Independent producers develop original programming for KWVT-LD, such as Garden Time, Fusion, High Desert Outdoorsman and Living Culture, as well as music video shows Hard Times, My Hits and Country Comfort. KWVT-LD has a high definition production facilities that covers area events such as high school football.

KWVT-LD is the local primary Emergency Alert System (EAS) station for the "(Oregon State) Capitol Operational Area".

History
The station signed on the air on channel 52, licensed to Eola, on May 20, 2005.

On May 8, 2007, Northwest Television sold channel 52 to Churchill Media of Eugene, Oregon. On August 17, 2007, channel 52 began carrying programming from the Spanish-language Azteca network, as KXPD-LP. (That station would cease operations by the end of 2009.)

Northwest Television had since moved to K17IV (channel 17), which adopted the KWVT-LP calls in November 2007, and changed the city of license from Eola to Salem.

In September 2008, Northwest Television activated a digital signal on KSLM-LD (channel 16). As of March 15, 2010, KSLM has moved to channel 27.

On December 31, 2022 Azteca America ceased operations.

Digital television

Digital channels
The station's digital signal is multiplexed:

Analog-to-digital conversion
KWVT-LP had a construction permit to convert to digital and move the transmitter to the Skyline Tower in Portland, Oregon, home to numerous TV and FM stations.

After negotiations to use the Skyline site broke down, other sites were considered. On December 22, 2010, an application was filed to locate the digital facility on the former KPDX tower, approximately half a kilometer from the Skyline tower. KWVT-LP would use the antenna MyNetworkTV affiliate KPDX (channel 49) had shut down at the end of the DTV transition. The modified construction permit was granted on January 7, 2011. Since no construction was required on the tower, KWVT-LP began transmitting a digital signal in Portland later the same day.

KWVT-LD remains available in Salem on a digital subchannel of KSLM-LD, and KSLM-LD programming (Retro TV) is also relayed to Portland on a digital subchannel of KWVT-LD. KWVT-LD and KSLM-LD also relay the programming of KPWC, which acquired the Azteca America affiliation after Churchill Media ceased operation of KXPD, as well as KVDO (QVC).

On December 31 of 2022 Azteca America cease operations.

Other translator stations
Northwest Television can also be viewed in other locations.
  Tillamook, Oregon
  Astoria, Oregon
  Corvallis, Oregon (launched 9/24/10)

References
 Azteca América.Press Release. May 8, 2007 
 Portland getting Spanish TV station. Portland Business Journal. May 9, 2007 
 Portland getting new Spanish-language TV station. The Oregonian. May 9, 2007. 
 Churchill Media acquires Salem area TV station. The Register-Guard. May 11, 2007.
 RabbitEars Query for KWVT-LD

Specific

External links
KWVT Homepage
Northwest Television Homepage

WVT-LD
Mass media in Salem, Oregon
Television channels and stations established in 2007
2007 establishments in Oregon
Low-power television stations in the United States